Highland Center is an unincorporated community in Highland Township, Franklin County, Indiana.

History
In 1915, Highland Center contained a general store, a blacksmith, and a small saloon.

Geography

References

Unincorporated communities in Franklin County, Indiana
Unincorporated communities in Indiana